Kellersberger's Map is a plat map created in 1854 of Rancho San Antonio on the northeastern shore lands, the Contra Costa of San Francisco Bay, in present day Alameda County, California.  The area surveyed today comprises the entire extent of the cities of Berkeley and Albany, and the northern part of Oakland, including its downtown and waterfront.

The map can be seen here: 1854 Map of the Vicente & Domingo Peralta Ranchos, Lithographed by Britton & Rey, courtesy of Barry Lawrence Ruderman Antique Maps Inc.

Kellersberger's Map was created by surveyor Julius Kellersberger in order to facilitate the subdivision of a portion of the Mexican land grant lands of the Alta California era Rancho San Antonio following the Mexican–American War and U.S. statehood.

Kellersberger had previously surveyed a map of the original claimed extent of the city of Oakland.

List of plots
The following is a partial list of the subdivision plots on Kellersberger's Map together with the names of their original claimants:
 57 – Peter Mathews (Ireland), 
 58 – Peter Mathews, 
 60 – Jean Noel, 
 62 – Juan Ysunza (Chile), 
 63 – Rosario Sisterna (Chile), 
 64 – Michael Curtis (Ireland), 
 65 – Francois Pioche (France via Chile), 
 67 – Francois Pioche, 
 68 – Francis K. Shattuck, 
 69 – George M. Blake, 
 70 – James Leonard (Ireland), 
 71 – William Hillegass, 
 78 – Joseph Irving, 
 89 – Jacob Irving, 
 City of Oakland, acreage unspecified
 Vicente Peralta Reserve, 
 Domingo Peralta Reserve, acreage unspecified

See also
 Ranchos of California
 List of Ranchos of California

References
 Map of the Ranchos of Vincente and Domingo Peralta Containing 16,970.68 Acres, Surveyed by Julius Kellersberger, originally filed January 21, 1857, Recorder's Office of Alameda County, re-filed June 22, 1870.

External links
 Kellersberger's Map of Oakland, filed September 2, 1853, reproduced in case of London & San Francisco Bank Limited. v. City of Oakland 90 F1d 691 (1898)

History of Alameda County, California
Geography of Alameda County, California
Geography of Berkeley, California
Mexican California
Geography of Oakland, California
History of the San Francisco Bay Area
19th century in Berkeley, California